The Kuvasz is a traditional Hungarian breed of flock guardian dog. Mention of the breed can be found in old Hungarian texts. They have historically been royal guard dogs, or guarded livestock, but have been increasingly found in homes as pets over the last seventy years. The American Kennel Club includes the breed in the working dog group.

History 

During the Migration Period and later Hungarian conquest of the Carpathian Basin, numerous nomadic or semi-nomadic tribes moved into the area that is now Hungary. The Principality of Hungary was founded in 895 or 896 AD. The Magyars probably brought sheep and dogs with them, and established a pastoral culture in the  Hungarian plains.

In the fifteenth century Matthias Corvinus is believed to have kept large numbers of Kuvasz dogs at his court as guard dogs or hunting dogs, or sometimes as war dogs.

Selective breeding of the Kuvasz as a breed began in the latter part of the nineteenth century, and a breed standard was drawn up. In 1934 it was accepted by the Fédération Cynologique Internationale, which lists the date of full acceptance as 1954.

By the end of World War II, nearly all the Kuvasz dogs in Hungary had been killed. The dogs had such a reputation for protecting their families that they were actively sought and killed by German and Soviet soldiers, while at the same time some German officers used to take Kuvasz dogs home with them.  After the Soviet invasion and the end of the war, the breed was nearly extinct in Hungary. After the war, it was revealed that fewer than thirty Kuvasz were left in Hungary and some sources indicate the number may have been as few as twelve. Since then, due to many dedicated breeders, Kuvasz breed have repopulated Hungary.  However, as a result of this near extinction, the genetic pool available to breeders was severely restricted and there is conjecture that some may have used other breeds, such as the Great Pyrenees, to continue their programs.

In Romania, a breed-specific legislation specifies that Kuvasz must be muzzled when in public places.

Characteristics 

The coat is white or ivory-white; it is thick and coarse, with a soft undercoat. The skin is slate-grey; the tip of the nose, the lips and the rims of the eyes are black, and the pads of the paws are black or slate-grey.

The head is wedge-shaped; the muzzle is slightly less than half the full length of the head, and the stop is slight. The eyes are almond-shaped, dark brown and slightly slanted.

Although generally a healthy and robust breed which can be expected to live approximately 12–14 years, the Kuvasz is prone to developmental bone problems.

See also
 Hungarian dog breeds
 Dogs portal
 List of dog breeds

Notes

References

Further reading 
Hódosi, József, ed. A Kuvasz. Hungaria Kuvasz Klub, 1996. English Translation by International Kuvasz Book Project.

Dog breeds originating in Hungary
FCI breeds
Hungarian words and phrases
Livestock guardian dogs